Sandals are an open type of footwear, consisting of a sole held to the wearer's foot by straps going over the instep and around the ankle. Sandals can also have a heel. While the distinction between sandals and other types of footwear can sometimes be blurry (as in the case of huaraches—the woven leather footwear seen in Mexico, and peep-toe pumps), the common understanding is that a sandal leaves all or most of the foot exposed. People may choose to wear sandals for several reasons, among them comfort in warm weather, economy (sandals tend to require less material than shoes and are usually easier to construct), and as a fashion choice.

Usually, people wear sandals in warmer climates or during warmer parts of the year in order to keep their feet cool and dry. The risk of developing athlete's foot is lower than with enclosed shoes, and the wearing of sandals may be part of the treatment regimen for such an infection.

History 

The oldest known sandals (and the oldest known footwear of any type) were discovered in Fort Rock Cave in the U.S. state of Oregon; radiocarbon dating of the sagebrush bark from which they were woven indicates an age of at least 10,000 years.

The word  is of Greek origin -  : sándalon. The ancient Greeks distinguished between:
  : kóthornos (Latinized as cothurnus), a boot sandal that rose above the middle of the leg, worn principally by tragic actors, horsemen, hunters, and by men of rank and authority. The sole of the cothurnus was sometimes made much thicker than usual by the insertion of slices of cork, so as to add to the stature of the wearer.

The ancient Egyptians wore sandals made of palm tree-leaves and papyrus. They are sometimes observable on the feet of Egyptian statues and in reliefs, being carried by sandal-bearers. According to Herodotus, sandals of papyrus were a part of the required and characteristic dress of the Egyptian priests.

In Ancient Greece sandals were the most common type of footwear that women wore and spent most of their time at home. The Greek sandals featured a multitude of straps with which they securely fastened to the foot. The top of the sandals were usually of colored leather. The soles were made of cattle skin, of even better quality and made up of several layers. In Ancient Rome residents used to carve their boots and sandals with elaborate designs.

In Ancient Levant sandals ("Biblical sandals") were made from non-processed leather and dry grass, and had strings or ropes made of simple, cheap materials. Occasionally golden or silver beads and even gems were added.

In his autobiography Edward Carpenter told how sandals came to be made in England:

Construction 

A sandal may have a sole made from rubber, leather, wood, tatami or rope.  It may be held to the foot by a narrow thong that generally passes between the first and second toe, or by a strap or lace, variously called a latchet, sabot strap or sandal, that passes over the arch of the foot or around the ankle. A sandal may or may not have a heel (either low or high) or heel strap.

Variants 
 Caligae, a heavy-soled classical Roman military shoe or sandal for marching, worn by all ranks up to and including centurion
 Clog can be formed as a heavy sandal, having a thick, typically wooden sole.
 Crochet sandals
 Fisherman sandal is a type of T-bar sandal originally for men and boys. The toes are enclosed by a number of leather bands interwoven with the central length-wise strap that lies along the instep. An adjustable cross strap or bar is fastened with a buckle. The heel may be fully enclosed or secured by a single strap joined to the cross strap. The style appears to have originated in France.
 Flip-flops are typically cheap and suitable for beach, pool, or locker room wear
 Geta, a classical Japanese form of elevated thong, traditionally of cryptomeria wood; the crosspiece is referred to as a ha, which translates to tooth
 Grecian sandal, sandals from Greece and Salento (Italy), a (generally flat or low) sole attached to the foot by interlaced straps crossing the toes and instep, and fastening around the ankle. A similar style is sometimes called gladiator sandal
 High-heeled sandal, a type of sandal with an elevated heel. They allow the wearer to have an open shoe while being less casual or more formal, depending on the style of the sandal.
 Hiking and trekking sandals are designed for hiking or trekking in hot and tropical climates, usually using robust rubber outsole, suitable for any terrain, and softer EVA or Super EVA foam insole. These sandals are usually shaped to support the arched contour of the foot. The straps are usually made of polyester or nylon webbing for quick drying after exposure to water and to minimize perspiration. Also suitable for many other adventure sports and activities where quick drying and reduced perspiration is required, including rafting, traveling, paragliding, skydiving.
 Ho Chi Minh sandals is one name for a homemade or cottage industry footwear, the soles cut from an old automobile tire and the straps cut from an inner tube. Made and worn in many countries, they became wider known in the US as worn by the rural people of Indochina during the Vietnam War, leading to the name.
 Huarache, a Mexican sandal, with sole made of a tire tread, or huarache (running shoe), a flat sandal used by minimalist runners.
 Jelly sandals or jelly shoes were originally a version of the classic fisherman sandal made in PVC plastic. They were invented in 1946 by Frenchman Jean Dauphant in response to a post-war leather shortage. Later designs featured translucent soft plastic in bright colours; hence the later name of jelly sandals or jellies. Recently, a whole range of styles have been produced in this material, mainly for women and girls, but the classic unisex design remains popular.
 Jesuslatschen
 Jipsin, a traditional Korean sandal made of straw
Ojota, an extremely durable Peruvian sandal made of recycled tires that is traditionally worn in the Andes by Quechua people.
 Paduka are the ancient (as old as the time of the Ramayana) Indian toe-knob sandals. They are not really worn on a daily basis now except by monks or for ceremonial purposes.
 Patten, a type of oversized clog often with a wooden sole or metal device to elevate the foot and increase the wearer's height or aid in walking in mud
 Roman sandal, a sandal held to the foot by a vamp composed of a series of equally spaced, buckled straps
 Saltwater sandals, a flat sandal developed in the 1940s as a way of coping with wartime leather shortages, primarily worn by children
 Soft foam sandals, invented in 1973, are made from closed-cell soft foam and uses surgical tubing for the straps. They are sold primarily along the Texas Gulf Coast in beach side gift shops.
 T-bar sandals, primarily for children, with an enclosed heel and toe. It is fastened by a cross-wise strap or bar secured by a buckle, or more recently by Velcro. A length-wise strap extends from the vamp and joins the cross-strap over the arch of the foot to form a T shape. A common variant has two cross-straps. The toe is often pierced with a pattern of holes or slots. The sole is low-heeled and usually of crepe rubber, stitched-down to the upper. First seen in Europe and America in the early 20th century, by the 1950s they were very common for boys and girls up to their teens, but are now mainly worn by much younger children. This style or similar styles are also called "Mary Jane" shoes.
 Waraji, Japanese straw sandals common in the Edo period
 Wörishofer, a ladies' sandal with a cork wedge heel
 Zōri, a flat and thonged Japanese sandal, usually made of straw, cloth, leather, or rubber

Gallery

See also 

 Birkenstock
 Crocs
 Keens
 Mules
 Slipper
 Socks and sandals

References

External links 

 
Footwear